"Hey Now Now" is a song by pop rock group Swirl 360. It was released as the lead single from the group's debut studio album, Ask Anybody. The song is the band's only significant hit.

Charts

Uses in media
"Hey Now Now" was featured in several movie soundtracks, including I Still Know What You Did Last Summer, Jack Frost, Muñeca Brava, and Our Lips Are Sealed.

References

1998 singles
1998 songs
Mercury Records singles
Songs written by John Shanks
Songs written by Shelly Peiken